Amprion GmbH (formerly RWE Transportnetz Strom GmbH) is one of the four transmission system operators for electricity in Germany with approx. 950 employees.

It is a member of European Network of Transmission System Operators for Electricity (ENTSO-E).

Managed Grid 

Grid length (380 kV): 5.300 km
Grid length (220 kV): 5.700 km

See also 

 50Hertz Transmission GmbH
 TenneT
 TransnetBW

References

External links

Electric power transmission system operators in Germany